Nova ScienceNow (styled NOVΛ scienceNOW) is a spinoff of the long-running and venerable PBS science program Nova. Premiering on January 25, 2005, the series was originally hosted by Robert Krulwich, who described it as an experiment in coverage of "breaking science, science that's right out of the lab, science that sometimes bumps up against politics, art, culture". At the beginning of season two, Neil deGrasse Tyson replaced Krulwich as the show's host. Tyson announced he would leave the show and was replaced by David Pogue in season 6.

The show was originally intended to return with more new episodes in 2015.

Production

Unlike the parent program Nova, Nova ScienceNow has a whimsical production style.  It is not unusual for the show to explain topics as arcane as RNA interference using cartoons, or a solution to a two-thousand-year-old math problem related in song. Whereas Nova covered a single seamless subject in each hour-long episode, NOVA scienceNOW covers several related, but distinct, story segments during the course of each program. The show also features 30⁠–⁠60 second short segments between each story segment, taking the place and pace of commercials in an otherwise uninterrupted program flow.

The show's humor turns on cultural references aimed at viewers from a broad spectrum of age groups. These references, for example, come from movies, TV, music, history, literature, and of course, science.

Following the whimsical format, the show's animators often place jokes or sight gags into the show's background via humorous or incongruous bits of text in signs, newspapers, etc.  These gags are intentionally subtle and meant to be difficult to recognize, presumably as a challenge to the viewer's observational skills.

When Tyson became host, he added a final segment in which he would add his own observations on the topic.  At the end of this editorial, he always states, "And that... is the cosmic perspective."

The series has been nominated for four Emmy Awards and won a CINE Golden Eagle award.

Cast
Host Robert Krulwich left the program at the end of the first season. He was replaced by astrophysicist Dr. Neil deGrasse Tyson, director of the Hayden Planetarium. In addition to the host, several correspondents report on many of the individual stories including Peter Standring, Chad Cohen, Ziya Tong, Carla Wohl, Rebecca Skloot, and David Duncan. David Pogue is the host of the show's sixth season.

Seasons

Episodes

Season 1 (2005–06)

Season 2 (2006–07)

Season 3 (2008)

Season 4 (2009)

Season 5 (2011)

Season 6 (2012)

Reception 
NOVΛ scienceNOW has received generally positive reviews from television critics and parents of young children. New York Daily News wrote, "★★★★ Lightyears from the norm."

References

External links
Nova ScienceNow Home page
 

PBS original programming
Television series by WGBH
2005 American television series debuts
2012 American television series endings
2000s American documentary television series
2010s American documentary television series
English-language television shows
American television spin-offs